The 2020–21 FA Women's Championship was the third season of the rebranded FA Women's Championship, the second tier of women's football in England.  It was renamed from the FA WSL 2 which was founded in 2014. The season began on 5 September 2020.

On 4 April 2021, Leicester City clinched the league title with a 2–0 win over London City Lionesses, their twelfth consecutive league victory dating back to 4–1 defeat at the hands of the same opposition on 1 November 2020. The result earned Leicester their first ever promotion to the top-flight FA WSL.

On the same day, London Bees' defeat away at Charlton Athletic coupled with a win for Coventry United against Blackburn Rovers sealed London Bees' relegation to the National League. It marked the first time since the 2012–13 FA Women's Premier League a club had been relegated from the second-tier on sporting merit.

Teams

Twelve teams were originally scheduled to compete in the Championship for the 2020–21 season, an increase of one team from the previous season. This was a planned progression of the restructuring of the English women's game, a move prompted to provide for a fully professional Women's Super League (WSL) starting with the 2018–19 season. Membership of both the first and second tier is subject to a license, based on a series of off-the-field criteria.

However, while the movement between the WSL and Championship was honoured with Aston Villa earning promotion and Liverpool taking their place, there was no relegation or promotion between the Championship and National League after the seasons from tier three and below were null and voided and results had been expunged. One team was scheduled to be relegated and replaced by the two winners of both the National League North and South divisions. At the time the season was curtailed, Charlton Athletic were declared bottom of the Championship on a points-per-game with Sunderland and Crawley Wasps leading the National League Premier Divisions prior to the cancellation. Without that movement between the second and third tiers, the season was again contested by eleven teams.

Managerial changes

Table

Results

Top goalscorers

Awards

Annual awards

See also
2020–21 FA Women's League Cup
2020–21 FA WSL (tier 1)
2020–21 FA Women's National League (tier 3 & 4)

References

External links
Official website

Women's Championship (England)
2
FA Women's Championship